Yuri Soares Liberator de Oliveira (born 11 September 1992), commonly known as Yuri, is a retired Brazilian footballer.

Career statistics

Club

Notes

References

1992 births
Living people
Brazilian footballers
Association football defenders
CR Vasco da Gama players
Fluminense FC players
Figueirense FC players
Bonsucesso Futebol Clube players
Footballers from Rio de Janeiro (city)